Alhaji Sir Muhammadu Sanusi I, KBE was the Acting Governor of Northern Nigeria (1957) and Emir of Kano from 1954 to 1963. He was the eldest son of Emir Abdullahi Bayero. He was a powerful Emir that had substantial influence in the colonial Northern Nigeria. He hosted a grand durbar festival for Elizabeth II when she visited Kano in 1956. The power tussle between him and his distant cousin Sir Ahmadu Bello the Sardauna of Sokoto and accusations of financial malfeasance led to his abdication, and subsequent self-exile in Azare 1963. His grandson, Sanusi Lamido Sanusi, former Governor of the Central Bank of Nigeria was Emir of Kano from 2014 to 2020. Sanusi belonged to the reformed Tijaniyya order of Ibrahim Niass

Life

Sanusi was born to the large family of Abdullahi Bayero, Emir of Kano, among his brothers was future Emir, Ado Bayero. He was the second son of Bayero but his elder brother died at an early age. He was educated at Kano Middle School. Prior to becoming Emir, Sanusi held the title of Ciroma Kano  and in 1947, he became a member of the regional House of Assembly. Sanusi was closely affiliated with Ibrahim Niass and the Tijani Sufi, for a while, he accompanied Niass on pilgrimages to Mecca and was later the appointed Caliph of the tijaniyyah order in Nigeria. He was also appointed a minister without portfolio in 1958 alongside other emirs like Usman Nagogo. In his memoir 
'An Imperial Twilight', Sir Gawain Bell narrates how he appointed Emir Sanusi to act in his stead as Governor of Northern Nigeria for six months in 1957.

Knighthood 

 Knighted into the Order of the British Empire

References

External links
 Sir Ahmadu Bello, and Muhammadu Sanusi I Visiting the United Nations, New York City, July 1960

Sources

Emirs of Kano
Knights Commander of the Order of the British Empire
Monarchs who abdicated
Nigerian Muslims
Nigerian recipients of British titles
Nigerian knights
People from Kano
Year of birth missing
Year of death missing